Nejat (and its variants Necat and Nedžad) is a male name of Turkish origin.  

Nejat might be derived from the German word "Naja" meaning "well" or "Nadja" meaning "hope". The name might be derived from the Persian word "Nezhad" meaning "race and nobility". In Persian language, Nejat has meaning of "rescue and to save".

People

Given name
Necat Ekinci, Turkish boxer
 Nejat Alp (born 1952), Turkish musician	
 Nenad Bijedić (1959–2011), Bosnian-Turkish football player, also known as Nejat Biyediç or Vardar
 Nejat Eczacıbaşı (1913–1993), Turkish chemist, industrialist, entrepreneur and philanthropist
 Nejat İşler (born 1972), Turkish actor
 Nejat Konuk (born 1928), former prime minister of Northern Cyprus
 Nejat Saydam (1929–2000), Turkish film director, screenwriter and actor
 Nejat Tulgar, (1920–1984), Turkish Olympic fencer
 Nejat Tümer (1924–2011), Turkish admiral
 Nejat Uygur (1927–2013), Turkish actor and comedian 
 Nejat Düzgüneş (born 1950), Turkish-American scientist 
 Nedžad Branković (born 1962), Bosnian politician
 Nedžad Fazlija (born 1968), Bosnian Olympic sports shooter
 Nedžad Ibrišimović (1940–2011), Bosnian writer and sculptor 
 Nedžad Mulabegović (born 1981), Croatian shot putter
 Nedžad Sinanović (born 1983), Bosnian professional basketball player
 Nedžad Verlašević (1955–2001), Yugoslav former football player

Surname
 Ethem Nejat (1883–1921), Turkish revolutionary communist 
 Fariba Nejat (born 1957), Iranian-American community leader, social activist, teacher and portrait painter

Places
 Boneh-ye Nejat, a village in Shoaybiyeh-ye Gharbi Rural District, Shadravan District, Shushtar County, Khuzestan Province, Iran

See also
 Necati
 Sadat-e Nejat (disambiguation)

Turkish masculine given names